Érick Agustín Silva Santos (born 13 January 1970) is a Mexican politician affiliated with the Institutional Revolutionary Party (PRI). He was the mayor of Matamoros, Tamaulipas from 2008 to 2010.

As of 2014 he served as Deputy of the LIX Legislature of the Mexican Congress representing Tamaulipas as replacement of Baltazar Hinojosa Ochoa.

Federal accusations
The U.S. Attorney's Office announced on November 10, 2014, that Silva was accused in a federal indictment for money laundering, bank fraud, public fund theft, and other financial charges. According to court documents, Silva transferred the ill funds from Mexico to U.S. banks; it is alleged that he lied about his bank statements and falsified documents.

References

1970 births
Living people
People from Matamoros, Tamaulipas
Institutional Revolutionary Party politicians
Members of the Chamber of Deputies (Mexico) for Tamaulipas